The Jersey Devil is a legendary creature of southern New Jersey.

Jersey Devil may also refer to:

Jersey Devil (album), a 2017  album by Matt Mondanile under his pseudonym Ducktails
Jersey Devil (video game), a 1997 3D platform game
"The Jersey Devil" (The X-Files), a television episode 
Jersey Devil Coaster, a roller coaster at Six Flags Great Adventure
Jersey Devils, a team in the Eastern Hockey League
New Jersey Devils, a hockey team in the NHL
"New Jersey Devi", a song by Ho99o9 on the album United States of Horror
177th Fighter Wing or Jersey Devils, a wing of the New Jersey Air National Guard
Nu Jerzey Devil, rapper associated with The Black Wall Street Records
Carny (2009 film), a Canadian television horror film also known as Jersey Devil
Sonya Deville, professional wrestler and former mixed martial artist whose nickname is "The Jersey Devil"